The 2014 Busan Open Challenger Tour was a professional tennis tournament played on hard courts. It was the thirteenth edition of the tournament which was part of the 2014 ATP Challenger Tour. It took place in Busan, South Korea between 12 and 18 May 2014.

Singles main-draw entrants

Seeds

 1 Rankings are as of May 5, 2014.

Other entrants
The following players received wildcards into the singles main draw:
  Chung Hyeon
  Kim Cheong-eui
  Lee Duckhee
  Nam Ji-sung

The following players used protected ranking to gain entry into the singles main draw:
  John Millman

The following players received entry from the qualifying draw:
  Jason Jung
  Fritz Wolmarans
  Danai Udomchoke
  Rik de Voest

Doubles main-draw entrants

Seeds

1 Rankings as of May 5, 2014.

Other entrants 
The following pairs received wildcards into the singles main draw:
 Nam Ji-sung /  Noh Sang-woo
 Chung Hyeon /  Lim Yong-kyu
 Gong Maoxin /  Peng Hsien-yin

The following pairs received entry from the qualifying draw:
  Jun Woong-sun /  Na Jung-woong

Champions

Singles

 Go Soeda def.  Jimmy Wang, 6–3, 7–6(7–5)

Doubles

 Sanchai Ratiwatana /  Sonchat Ratiwatana def.  Jamie Delgado /  John-Patrick Smith, 6–4, 6–4

External links
Official Website

Busan Open Challenger Tour
Busan Open
May 2014 sports events in South Korea
Busan